Susan Walden (August 20, 1956 – August 17, 2020) was an American film and television actress.

Early years 
Born in Georgia, Walden was the daughter of Buddy and Bette Walden. She began acting while she was a student at Tate High School. Before she graduated from Tate she won school recognition for beauty and academics. In 1974 she won the Miss Escambia County Junior Miss title in 1974 and was runner-up for America's Junior Miss. She was an honor graduate of the University of Southern California, where she was a member of Phi Beta Kappa.

Career 
She started her career on The Young and the Restless in the early 1970s, and was best known for her role as J.L. Duval on the hit Canadian TV Show Danger Bay (1984–90). In 1980, she starred in the TV mini series The Contender, on which she played Lucinda Waverly.

During the 1980s, Walden appeared on many TV shows on various American networks, including The Dukes of Hazzard, MacGyver, Matlock, Three's Company, T.J. Hooker, etc.

In 1987, she appeared in The Disney Sunday Movie titled Double Agent (1987), featuring Michael McKean, Lloyd Bochner, and John Putch. Double Agent was first telecast on March 29, 1987. She continued to act until 2001. Her last role was on the television series Titus.

Death 
She died on August 17, 2020 at age 63, at her home in Pensacola, Florida.

Awards
She was nominated for a Gemini Award (Best Performance by a Lead Actress in a Continuing Dramatic Series) for Danger Bay in 1986.

Filmography
Winter Kills (1979)
A Matter of the Heart (1982)
Double Agent (1987)
Deep Dark Secrets (1987)
Taking Back My Life: The Nancy Ziegenmeyer Story (1992)

References

External links

Place of birth missing (living people)
Living people
American television actresses
American film actresses
Canadian television actresses
Canadian film actresses
21st-century American women
1956 births
University of Southern California alumni